Francisco Uranga (born 1905, date of death unknown) was an Argentine freestyle swimmer. He competed in two events and the water polo tournament at the 1928 Summer Olympics.

References

External links
 

1905 births
Year of death missing
Argentine male freestyle swimmers
Argentine male water polo players
Olympic swimmers of Argentina
Olympic water polo players of Argentina
Swimmers at the 1928 Summer Olympics
Water polo players at the 1928 Summer Olympics
Place of birth missing